Bayside Council is a southern local government area in New South Wales, Australia. It includes suburbs of Southern Sydney and the St George area separated by the Cooks River as well as a small portion in the eastern suburbs.

The Council was formed on 9 September 2016 from the merger of the City of Botany Bay and the City of Rockdale.

The Council's mayor is Christina Curry, of the Australian Labor Party, elected by the Council on 5 January 2022.

Suburbs and localities in the local government area 
Suburbs in the Bayside Council area are:

Bayside Council also manages and maintains the following localities:

History

Early local government history

Rockdale
The City of Rockdale was originally proclaimed as the "Municipal District of West Botany" on 13 January 1871. From 1872, Council met in the first Council Chambers, a small purpose-built stone building on the western side of Rocky Point Road, Arncliffe. It continued in use until 11 December 1888, when a new Town Hall was opened on the corner of Rocky Point Road and Bryant Street, Rockdale. By the time the neighbouring Boroughs of Botany and North Botany (Mascot from 1911) were proclaimed on 29 March 1888, it was clear that a name change was desirable. On 17 May 1888 the Parliament of New South Wales passed the Rockdale Municipality Naming Act (No.33, 1888), and West Botany became the "Municipal District of Rockdale". The 1887 Town Hall was replaced by the current Rockdale Town Hall in 1940, and was designed by Rockdale architect Douglas Gardiner. Under the Local Government (Areas) Act 1948, the Municipality of Bexley, which was located immediately to the West and had separated from Hurstville in 1900, became the First Ward of Rockdale Municipality. Rockdale was declared a city in 1995 as the "City of Rockdale".

Botany
The City of Botany Bay was first proclaimed on 29 March 1888 as the "Borough of Botany", and met from 1899 to 2016 in the Botany Town Hall. The northern section of the City of Botany Bay was first incorporated as the "Borough of North Botany" on 29 March 1888. From 28 December 1906, following the passing of the Local Government Act, 1906, the councils were renamed as the "Municipality of North Botany" and the "Municipality of Botany". The Municipality of North Botany was renamed as the "Municipality of Mascot" on 31 October 1911. Under the Local Government (Areas) Act 1948, the Municipality of Mascot was amalgamated into Botany, within a reconstituted Municipality of Botany. Botany remained a municipality until 11 May 1996, when it was proclaimed the "City of Botany Bay".

Establishment of Bayside Council

There was significant community opposition to the merger from within both communities. In Botany Bay, residents were given the chance to have their say in a community poll which was held on 27 February 2016. Ultimately 97.8 per cent of Botany Bay residents voted 'no' when asked the question 'Do you agree that the City of Botany Bay should merge with Rockdale City Council?'. Rockdale City Council indicated their preference to merge with the City of Kogarah and the City of Hurstville, forming a single "St George Council". Botany Bay also attempted to seek a compromise by proposing to merge with the City of Randwick and parts of the City of Sydney.

With the proclamation of the majority of Council amalgamations on 12 May 2016, the City of Botany Bay Council appealed the decision in the Supreme Court of New South Wales, thereby delaying the proposed amalgamation until a decision was made by the Court. The Supreme Court rejected the appeal in early September 2016, and the Minister for Local Government, Paul Toole, moved quickly to proclaim the formation of Bayside Council on 9 September 2016, with the former Administrator of Central Darling Shire, Greg Wright, appointed as the Administrator. On 9 September 2017, the first Council consisting of fifteen Councillors across 5 wards was elected, and the former Mayor of Rockdale, Bill Saravinovski, was elected as the first Mayor on 27 September.

The early period of the council was punctuated by revelations of the extent of issues inherited from the former Botany Bay Council, including an antiquated vehicle fleet costing millions of dollars to replace, and the legacy of ICAC investigations that uncovered the significant misappropriation of funds and fraud by former Botany Bay Council employees, which had led to 12 individuals being recommended for prosecution. The first Mayor of Bayside Council, Bill Saravinovski, in particular noted that, "The legacy of the misappropriations and costs of remediation result[ed] in a net fund deficit of $17 million, placing Bayside Council at a significant disadvantage".

Demographics
Aboriginal and Torres Strait Islander people made up 1.0 per cent of the population; significantly below the NSW and Australian averages of 2.9 and 2.8 per cent respectively. The median age of people in Bayside Council was 35 years; slightly lower than the national median of 38 years. Children aged 0 – 14 years made up 21.4 per cent of the population and people aged 65 years and over made up 13.5 per cent of the population. Of people in the area aged 15 years and over, 61.6 per cent were married and 7.1 per cent were either divorced or separated.

At the 2016 census, the proportion of residents in the Bayside local government area who stated their ancestry as Australian or Anglo-Saxon approached 29 per cent of all residents. In excess of 51 per cent of all residents in Bayside Council nominated a religious affiliation with Christianity at the 2016 census, which was below the national average of 57.7 per cent. Meanwhile, as at the census date, compared to the national average, households in the Bayside local government area had a lower than average proportion (20.7 per cent) where two or more languages are spoken (national average was 22.2 per cent); and a lower proportion (41.1 per cent) where English only was spoken at home (national average was 72.7 per cent).

Council
Bayside Council has fifteen councillors, with three councillors elected in each of five wards by a preferential voting system. On 9 September 2017 the first council was elected. The mayor is appointed biennially and deputy mayor annually by the councillors at the first meeting of the Council.

Current composition
The most recent election was held on 4 December 2021, and the makeup of the Council, by order of election, is as follows:

Ward names
Owing to a perceived confusion over the ward names, particularly from members of the public not able to distinguish between their ward and their suburb, at its meeting on 14 November 2018, Bayside Council voted to exhibit changes to the ward names: "Port Botany Ward" to Ward 1, "Mascot Ward" to Ward 2, "Rockdale Ward" to Ward 3, "Bexley Ward" to Ward 4, and "Botany Bay Ward" to Ward 5. At the subsequent meeting on 13 February 2019, Bayside Council voted to adopt these changes, despite the public consultation resulting in 69% of 83 submissions not supporting the change of ward names to numbers.

Council logo
In August 2017, Bayside Council selected its new logo via a public competition and vote, with Mascot resident, Ray Kurniawan's design winning. The logo depicts a sailing boat above water, with Kurniawan describing its symbolism: "The concept to use the boat came from the idea that to move forward in a boat everyone has to row together. Bayside is a new community and to move forward everyone needs to work together".

See also

 Local government areas of New South Wales

References

External links
Bayside Council

 
2016 establishments in Australia
Botany Bay
Local government areas in Sydney